Simion Vartolomeu (born 24 June 1891, date of death unknown) was a Romanian sports shooter. He competed in three events at the 1924 Summer Olympics.

References

External links
 

1891 births
Year of death missing
Romanian male sport shooters
Olympic shooters of Romania
Shooters at the 1924 Summer Olympics
Place of birth missing